Rossano Brasi (born 3 June 1972) is an Italian former professional racing cyclist. He competed in the team pursuit at the 1992 Summer Olympics. He was professional from 1995 to 2002 with the teams Polti and De Nardi.

Major results
1989
 1st  Team time trial, UCI Junior Road World Championships (with Andrea Peron, Davide Rebellin & Cristian Salvato)
1990
 2nd  Team time trial, UCI Junior Road World Championships
1992
 1st Stage 10 Settimana Ciclistica Lombarda
1993
 1st  Team time trial, UCI Road World Championships (with Gianfranco Contri, Cristian Salvato & Rosario Fina)
1994
 3rd Time trial, National Road Championships
 3rd Overall Reading Classic
1995
 1st Scheldeprijs
1996
 1st HEW Cyclassics
1999
 2nd GP d'Europe

Grand Tour general classification results timeline

References

External links

1972 births
Living people
Italian male cyclists
Olympic cyclists of Italy
Cyclists at the 1992 Summer Olympics
UCI Road World Champions (elite men)
Cyclists from Bergamo